"Guy Walks into a Psychiatrist's Office..." is the 14th episode of the HBO original series The Sopranos and the first of the show's second season. Written by Jason Cahill and directed by Allen Coulter, it originally aired on January 16, 2000.

Starring
 James Gandolfini as Tony Soprano
 Lorraine Bracco as Dr. Jennifer Melfi
 Edie Falco as Carmela Soprano
 Michael Imperioli as Christopher Moltisanti
 Dominic Chianese as Corrado Soprano, Jr.
 Vincent Pastore as Big Pussy Bonpensiero
 Steven Van Zandt as Silvio Dante
 Tony Sirico as Paulie Gualtieri
 Robert Iler as Anthony Soprano, Jr.
 Jamie-Lynn Sigler as Meadow Soprano
 Drea de Matteo as Adriana La Cerva
 Aida Turturro as Janice Soprano
 Nancy Marchand as Livia Soprano

Guest starring
 Jerry Adler as Hesh Rabkin

Also guest starring

Synopsis
Several months after Mikey Palmice's execution, Livia Soprano's hospitalization, and Uncle Junior's arrest, business appears to be returning to normal. Tony Soprano is no longer receiving therapy from Dr. Melfi and is self-medicating. When his mother is mentioned, he says, "She's dead to me." He is still seeing Irina. The money is still coming in from Ray Curto, Paulie Gualtieri, and Silvio Dante. Philly Parisi is killed for spreading gossip about Tony, his mother, and his uncle.

Tony's older sister Janice arrives from Seattle. Tony is apprehensive because he knows she will make financial demands but he lets her stay at his home. At a family gathering, Carmela smiles as she watches Tony embracing Janice and his younger sister, Barbara. But Janice is interested in Livia's will and her house. Tony is trying to sell the house and suspects that Janice is trying to obstruct the sale.

Tony's mood worsens after Janice comes. While driving, he passes out and runs off the road. He consults a new psychiatrist, who tells Tony that he recognizes him and is not taking new patients. He phones Dr. Melfi in the motel room where she is seeing patients, and tells her things are now safe; she is frightened, realizing that he knows where she is. He confronts her in a diner and tries to apologize. She tells him one of her patients committed suicide because her treatment was disrupted. On his side, he tries to reassure her that "nobody got killed because of you." After a furious pause, she says, "Get out of my life."

Christopher Moltisanti hires someone to take his stockbroker's licensing exam and becomes the SEC compliance officer in an investment firm. It is actually a boiler room operating a "pump and dump" scam. He is assisted by two young men eager to make a mark, Matt Bevilaqua and Sean Gismonte. While Christopher is out of the office, the pair beat one of the brokers who was providing genuine investment advice. Tony rebukes Christopher, telling him to take his responsibilities seriously, but ends the meeting with a smile.

Big Pussy Bonpensiero appears at the bottom of Tony's driveway one morning. In Tony's basement, Pussy explains that he has been in Puerto Rico having his back treated and got involved with a woman there. He expresses his resentment at being suspected of turning informant. Tony is at first furious that he has not been in touch. He pats him down while giving him a hug; when Pussy is offended, he pulls him in for a real one. He allows Pussy to start earning again but remains suspicious, though his story appears to check out.

First appearances
 Hugh De Angelis: Carmela's father.
 Mary De Angelis: Carmela's mother.
 Matthew Bevilaqua and Sean Gismonte: Associates who work as stockbrokers at Christopher's firm who are looking to get themselves recognized by the DiMeo crime family.
 Gigi Cestone: soldier in the Junior Soprano crew.
 Neil Mink: Tony Soprano's attorney and confidante.
 Thomas Giglione: Barbara Soprano's husband and Tony and Janice's brother-in-law.
This also marks the first present-day appearances of Janice Soprano (also known as Parvati Wasatch): Tony's older sister, who resurfaces after a 20-year absence while living in Seattle, and Barbara Soprano Giglione: Tony's younger sister, who lives in Brewster, New York. Previously, both of these characters appeared (as children) in flashbacks in "Down Neck".

Deceased
 Philly "Spoons" Parisi: killed by Gigi Cestone for spreading rumors that Tony likes to "fluff his mother's pillows."  Dan Grimaldi later returned to the series as Philly's twin brother, Patsy.

Title reference
 The episode's title is intended to be the beginning of a joke (for example, "Guy walks into a bar and..."). It refers to Tony's therapy sessions.

Production
 Drea de Matteo (Adriana La Cerva) and Aida Turturro (Janice Soprano) are now billed in the opening credits.
 Show producer/writer/director Terence Winter appears as minor character Tom Amberson, a Dr. Melfi patient in the first of his three series' appearances. Winter was filling in when no other actor pleased director Allen Coulter.

References to past episodes
It is revealed in this episode that Carmela's parents have avoided family functions at the Soprano home that Livia attended for years.
In Season One episode "Nobody Knows Anything" Tony tells Livia that her house, which he put up for sale, has an accepted offer, a move that angered Livia so much that she revealed to Junior that Tony and his capos held secret meetings at Green Grove. However, in this episode, Tony reveals to Janice that he just had the house put on the market.

Cultural references
 Edward G. Robinson, playing a mobster, is briefly seen and heard as Key Largo plays on a TV in Christopher's apartment.
 When Adriana picks up Christopher in his office, she calls him "E.F." and tells him she "is listening"; a reference to the ads for brokerage of E.F. Hutton and their 1970s advertising slogan "When E.F. Hutton talks, people listen".
 Silvio makes several imitations of actors in The Godfather and The Godfather Part III
 At Tony's cookout, the crew chats about Shelley Hack (of Charlie's Angels fame), leading to Paulie Gualtieri singing the jingle for Charlie cologne. Besides co-starring on Charlie's Angels, Shelley Hack was also the model appearing in advertisements for Charlie perfume by Revlon.
Phillip Parisi's death is a reference to The Godfather (1972) when Paulie Gatto is shot and killed in the driver's seat of a car because of his role in the attempted murder of Vito Corleone. Also, as Philly gets in his car to leave home, his wife tells him, "Don't forget the pastries", a reference to the scene where Peter Clemenza's wife also tells him, "Don't forget the cannoli", before he drives off to see that Paulie is killed.
 When Tony is seeing his prospective new psychiatrist using an assumed name, and the psychiatrist says that he recognizes Tony from the news, he also mentions the 1999 comedy film Analyze This, a film that stars Robert De Niro as a gangster who is seeing a psychiatrist, played by Billy Crystal.

Music
 After the opening credits, the episode shows the status of all the major characters, overscored by Frank Sinatra's "It Was a Very Good Year".
 The song played during Sil's The Godfather prank in the Bing! is "Nod Off" by Skeleton Key.
 During the Soprano family barbecue, Andrea Bocelli's "Con te partirò" is playing in the background.
 While Tony is driving in his truck before he passes out and crashes, he is listening to Deep Purple's "Smoke on the Water" (a song also used in the Season Six episode "Join the Club)".
 The song played when Christopher is in the bar with Adriana, Matthew and Sean is Alejandro Escovedo's "Guilty" from his 1999 album Bourbonitis Blues.
 The song played over the end credits is "Time Is on My Side" by Irma Thomas.

Filming locations 
Listed in order of first appearance:

 Montclair, New Jersey
 Fort Lee, New Jersey
 Ridgefield, New Jersey
 North Caldwell, New Jersey
 Teterboro, New Jersey
 Teterboro Airport
 Newark Liberty International Airport
 Bridge Street Bridge between Newark and Harrison, New Jersey
 Satin Dolls in Lodi, New Jersey
 Verona, New Jersey
 Lodi, New Jersey
 Newark, New Jersey
 Clifton, New Jersey

References

External links
"Guy Walks into a Psychiatrist's Office..."  at HBO

The Sopranos (season 2) episodes
2000 American television episodes
Television episodes directed by Allen Coulter

fr:S.O.S. Psychiatre